Crime in Panama is investigated by the Panamanian police.

Crime by type

Murder

In 2012, Panama had a murder rate of 17.2 per 100,000 population. There were a total of 654 murders in Panama in 2012.

Kidnapping
Panamanian authorities conducted a study which indicates that almost 90 percent of express kidnappings are unreported due to the threat that thieves impose on the victim and relatives of the victim. The procedure of express kidnapping consist of abducting the victim and taking possession of valuables such as cellphones, watches, credit cards, cash and jewelry. Besides taking all of the victim's valuables, the kidnappers make the victim withdraw money from different ATM locations.

Once the kidnapper is satisfied, the abducted person is usually released. In other cases, the kidnappers may ask for ransom money for the release of the victim. This long process of kidnapping is slowly decreasing, since most kidnappers want a quick payoff without complicated negotiations with relatives.

Illegal drug trade

In recent decades, (1980's [15,16]) has become an important connection for shipping narcotics to the US and other countries. The International Narcotics Control Strategy has reported that traffickers have smuggled narcotics through the country's uncontrolled transportation system, such as airfields, coastlines, containerized seaports and highways.
The FARC (Revolutionary Armed Forces of Colombia) has also contributed to the increase.

Many of the FARC soldiers who seek shelter and refugee from Colombian Armed Forces cross the border between Darien and Colombia. Since the FARC arrived in Panama, drug trafficking has significantly increased. Waterways are being watched carefully by the Panamanian Naval Forces, but the FARC has adapted ways of smuggling narcotics across Panama by land.

Panama's involvement in drug trafficking began as early as the beginning of the 20th century, when opium was trafficked through the Panama Canal on its voyage from Asia to Europe. In the 1960s Panama's involvement with drug trade was its production of cannabis, but by the 1980s it became one of the transit points for the drug trafficking of cocaine from South America to the United States thanks to its shared border with Columbia.

Robbery
Robberies prevalent in Panama include armed robberies and muggings.

Domestic violence

Domestic violence in Panama is a serious problem and remains underreported.
Domestic violence, including spousal rape, psychological, physical, and economic abuse, are criminalized. Panama enacted Ley No.38 del 2001 against domestic violence. In 2013, the country enacted Law 82 - Typifying Femicide and Violence Against Women (Ley 82 - Tipifica el Femicidio y la Violencia contra las Mujeres) a comprehensive law against violence against women.

By location
Based upon reported incidents by local police, the high-crime areas around Panama City are San Miguelito, Río Abajo, El Chorrillo, Ancón, Tocumen, Pedregal, Curundu, Veracruz Beach, Panamá Viejo, and the Madden Dam overlook.

In its 2015 report, the US State Department cited the more dangerous areas of Panama City are: Panama Viejo (the neighborhood, not the park itself), Cabo Verde, Curundu, San Miguel, Marañon, Chorillo, Barraza, Santana, Monte Oscuro, San Miguelito, Ciudad Radial, San Cristobal, San Pedro, Pedregal, San Juaquin, Mañanitas, Nuevo Tocumen, 24 de Diciembre, Sector Sur Tocumen, Felipillo, Chilibre, Caimitillo, Alcalde Diaz, and Pacora.

Crime dynamics

Street gangs
The Panamanian gangs appeared in the late 1950s after a group of local college students forcefully attempted to gain access to an American Army Post, Ft. Amador, and were shot and killed. The gangs have increased in numbers since the Panamanian Army was disbanded in 1990 due to the United States invasion of Panama. A 2009 census reported that there are about 108 street gangs.

More than 1,600 youths between the ages of 13 and 15 are affiliated with youth gangs. Most of the youth gangs are fueled by drugs.

Government action
Police checkpoints have become commonplace during weekends on roads in between cities. However, most are simply drivers license and plate checks.

Curfews
Panamanian authorities have adopted a curfew policy for youths under 18 years of age. Students who are attending night classes must carry a permit or identification card, provided by the school or an official certified person. Youths under 18 who are caught without them are subject to detention at a police station until they are released to their legal guardians. A fine around $50.00 is issued to the legal guardians if the youth is apprehended for the first time.

Curfews consist of special strategic checkpoints around the main streets in Panama. Each person inside a vehicle must carry an identification card or be accompanied by their legal guardians. Authorities have helped slowly decrease the amount of unattended youth loitering around the streets. Most thefts and kidnappings are carried out by minors.

See also
 Law enforcement in Panama
 Penal system of Panama

References

External links
 Panama 2013 Crime and Safety Report